WBFI (91.5 FM) is a radio station  broadcasting a Gospel Music format. The station is licensed to McDaniels, Kentucky, United States. The station is currently owned by Bethel Fellowship, Inc.

History
After the construction permit was initially issued in 1985, the station first signed on the air in 1987 under ownership of the Bethel Fellowship Church and Christian School. It originally functioned as an educational tool for the school, as well as outreach media outlet of the church.

In 2017, the station became the flagship for a regional network called BoxTwo Radio Network.

Translators
In addition to the main station, WBFI is relayed by a translator to widen its broadcast area.

References

External links

Station website

Radio stations established in 1987 
Christian radio stations in Kentucky